Scarsdale could be

Scarsdale, New York, a village and town in Westchester County, New York, United States, for which The Complete Scarsdale Medical Diet is named
Scarsdale (Metro-North station), a station serves the residents of Scarsdale, New York via the Harlem Line
Scarsdale (hundred), an ancient hundred of Derbyshire, England
Scarsdale, Victoria, a town in Golden Plains Shire south of Ballarat, Australia